Nic Billington is a singer and songwriter from Durban, South Africa. His debut album, Overload, was released in February 2013. The lead single, by the same name, reached number 5 on 94.7 Highveld Stereo and 94.5 Kfm's Take 40 SA.

Billington was discovered on YouTube by his record company, Clango Media. A few months later they signed him on.

Discography

Singles and Music Videos
 "Kiss" (2011)
 "Overload (Into the Wonderful)" (2012)
 "Overload" (2013)
 "Vixen" (2013)

References

21st-century South African male singers
Musicians from Durban
Year of birth missing (living people)
Living people